Hajjah Fatimah binte Sulaiman, also known as Hajjah Fatimah and as the "Sultana of Gowa", was a Singaporean merchant and philanthropist. After the death of her second husband, she combined his business with her own boats and built it into a successful naval trading operation. Fatimah is best known for commissioning the mosque that bears her name, Masjid Hajjah Fatimah. In recognition of her philanthropy in funding the creation of the mosque, as well as homes for the poor that were adjacent to it, Fatimah was inducted into the Singapore Women's Hall of Fame in 2014

Background
Fatimah binte Sulaiman was born in Malacca, Malaysia, to a family of successful traders. The year of her birth is not certain, but is believed to be 1754. After the collapse of an unsuccessful first marriage, she married Daing Chanda Pulih, a Bugis prince and merchant from South Sulawesi (then known as Celebes). Pulih had a trading post in Singapore, and brought Fatimah binte Sulaiman with him to the island. Pulih died while Fatimah was still young, and she combined his business with her own boats and built a successful steamship and sailboat-based trading operation.

Before her husband died, Fatimah had a daughter with him, Raja Siti. Raja would go on to marry Syed Ahmad Abdulrahman Alsagoff, whose family would become known for their philanthropy, like Fatimah herself.

Fatimah is commonly referred to as "Hajjah Fatimah", indicating that she made the a pilgrimage to Mecca, or Hajj. The exact date of her death is unknown, but her family claims that Fatimah lived to the age of 98. She is buried on the grounds of the Masjid Hajjah Fatimah, along with her husband, her daughter and son-in-law's, and several of their descendants.

Masjid Hajjah Fatimah

Fatimah's wealth led to her becoming known as the "Sultana of Gowa". It also made her residence in Kampong Glam the target of thieves, who burgled it twice and set it on fire during the second burglary. After the fire, Fatimah — thankful that she was not present for the burglaries and thus was not harmed — donated money and the land that her house was on in provide for the construction of a mosque, which became the Masjid Hajjah Fatimah. Fatimah rebuilt her own house, and also funded the construction of houses for the poor, in the land adjacent to the new. The Masjid Hajjah Fatimah is one of only a small number of mosques that are named after women.

For her philanthropy and role in establishing the mosque that bears her name, Hajjah Fatimah binte Sulaiman was inducted into the Singapore Women's Hall of Fame in 2014, the Hall of Fame's inaugural year. She had previously been honored in a nine-member Wall of Fame that evolved into the larger Hall of Fame.

References

Singaporean philanthropists
People from Malacca
Singaporean businesspeople
Year of death uncertain
Year of birth uncertain
1750s births
1850s deaths